Khosraviyeh (also Romanized as Khosravīyeh; also known as Khosravī) is a village in Qaleh Chenan Rural District, in the Central District of Karun County, Khuzestan Province, Iran. At the 2006 census, its population was 151, in 21 families.

References 

Populated places in Karun County